Banyaran-e Teymur (also Romanized as Bānyārān-e Teymūr; also known as Banīārān-e Seyyed Kākī, Bān Yārān-e Teymūr, Bānyārān Kākī, Deh-e Teymūr, Takya Taimūr, and Takyeh-ye Teymūr) is a village in Qalkhani Rural District, Gahvareh District, Dalahu County, Kermanshah Province, Iran. At the 2006 census, its population was 78, in 21 families. in it there is a shrine to Hazrat Teimur an important figure in Yarsanism.

References 

Populated places in Dalahu County
Yarsan holy places